The UK Singles Chart is compiled by the Official Charts Company (OCC) on behalf of the British record industry. In the 2000s the chart week ran from Sunday to Saturday, and the top 40 singles were revealed each Sunday on BBC Radio 1. Before the advent of music downloads, it was based entirely on sales of physical singles from retail outlets, but since 2005 permanent downloads have been included in the chart compilation.

During the 2000s, 275 singles reached the No. 1 position on the chart, the most of any decade so far. Over this period, Westlife were the most successful group and music act at reaching the top spot, with 11 No. 1 singles. Rihanna and Jay-Z's song "Umbrella" spent 10 weeks at No. 1 in 2007, the longest spell at the top of the charts since Wet Wet Wet's 1994 hit "Love Is All Around", which topped the charts for 15 weeks. The Internet allowed music to be heard by vast numbers of people on social networking sites such as YouTube and Myspace; it also increased piracy. This and the introduction of the UK Singles Downloads Chart in 2004 led to a decrease in record sales and a reduction in the number of copies sold of a No. 1 record on the singles chart. Gnarls Barkley's "Crazy" became the first song to reach the top of the charts based on downloads alone in 2006, remaining at No. 1 for nine consecutive weeks.

Physical single sales had been falling for more than a decade but digital single sales finally turned the trend around in 2008 with combined physical and digital single sales growing 33% over the previous year. Lily Allen made herself known on the Internet through her Myspace page, and following this exposure, her debut single "Smile" peaked at No. 1. Three years later, her single "The Fear" topped the chart for four consecutive weeks, being the longest running No. 1 single of 2009.

Reality television shows played an important and influential role on the charts during the decade. Hear'Say won the original series of Popstars in 2000 and topped the charts with their debut single "Pure and Simple". A trend developed as this feat was replicated by Pop Idol winners Will Young (2002) and Michelle McManus (2003), and runners-up Gareth Gates and Sam & Mark; 2002 Fame Academy winner David Sneddon, and the winner of the first series of The X Factor, Steve Brookstein, in 2005. Reality television winners did especially well during the Christmas season; every Christmas No. 1 from 2005 to 2008 came from an X Factor winner. Shayne Ward reached No. 1 in 2005 with "That's My Goal", and he was followed by Leona Lewis, Leon Jackson and Alexandra Burke. Girls Aloud, the Popstars: The Rivals winners, also had the Christmas No. 1 in 2002 with "Sound of the Underground." Kelly Clarkson, the winner of the first series of American Idol achieved her first UK No. 1 single, "My Life Would Suck Without You", in 2009.

The first No. 1 of the decade, the double-A side "I Have a Dream" / "Seasons in the Sun" by Westlife, was a holdover from the end of 1999. "Killing in the Name" by Rage Against the Machine was the final No. 1 of the decade. In January 2005, a landmark was reached as the re-release of Elvis Presley's "One Night" became the 1,000th single to reach No. 1 in the singles chart.

Chart history
In 2000, 42 songs (not including Westlife's "I Have a Dream" / "Seasons in the Sun" which first reached number one at the end of 1999) hit the top spot, a UK charts record for most number ones in a calendar year. The year 2000 also holds the record for most consecutive weeks with a new number one, with a different single hitting the number-one spot every week from 24 June to 16 September.

Six songs returned to the top of the charts for two separate spells. These were; "Don't Stop Movin'" by S Club 7 (2001), "Gotta Get thru This" by Daniel Bedingfield (2001–2002), "Call on Me" by Eric Prydz (2004), "Hips Don't Lie" by Shakira featuring Wyclef Jean (2006) and "Boom Boom Pow" (2009) and "I Gotta Feeling" (2009) by The Black Eyed Peas. In addition, Lady Gaga's "Bad Romance" was number one in December 2009 and climbed back to the top in January 2010.

Number-one singles

Statistics by decade

By artist
The following artists achieved four or more number-one hits during the 2000s. A number of artists had number-one singles on their own as well as part of a collaboration. Madonna, Timbaland and Justin Timberlake's song "4 Minutes", for example, is counted for all three artists because they were credited on the cover, while "Where Is the Love?" does not count for Timberlake as he did not receive artist credit on that track in order to avoid overexposure.

Artists by total number of weeks at number one

Songs by total number of weeks at number one

A.  Total includes appearances on Rihanna's "Umbrella" and Beyoncé's "Crazy in Love" and "Déjà Vu".
B.  Total does not include two weeks spent at number one at the end of 1999 with "I Have a Dream" / "Seasons in the Sun".
D.  Total includes collaboration with Dizzee Rascal.
E.  Total includes Band Aid 20.
F.  Total includes credit as Brian Potter.

By record label

The following record labels had five or more number ones on the UK Singles Chart during the 2000s.

Million-selling and Platinum records
In April 1973, the British Phonographic Industry (BPI) began classifying singles and albums by the number of units shipped. The highest threshold is "Platinum" which, since 1989, is awarded to singles with over 600,000 units.

In July 2013, the BPI started a process of automatic certification regardless of original release dates, and since July 2014 audio streaming is included in the calculation of units at 100 streams equivalent to 1 sale or shipment. Hence, many of the singles released in the 2000s have been awarded certification in the 2010s.

For singles selling 1 million copies during the 2000s see List of best-selling singles of the 2000s (decade) in the United Kingdom

For a full list of singles which were released during the 2000s and have sold 1 million copies see List of million-selling singles in the United Kingdom and sort the table by release date

For Platinum singles released during the 2000s see List of Platinum singles in the United Kingdom awarded since 2000

Notes

References
General

Specific

2000s
2000s in British music
United Kingdom Singles